Narc, nark or NARC may refer to:

Places
 Nark, Iran, a village in Razavi Khorasan Province

People
 An informant, sometimes known as a nark or narc
 Nark of Champasak, a king in Laos
 Vaughn Nark, jazz trumpeter

Art, entertainment, and media

Fictional characters
 Narc, an orc-like character in the parody Bored of the Rings
 Narc, a minor character in the animated TV series Samurai Jack

Other arts, entertainment, and media
 Narc (film), a 2002 film
 Narc (video game), a 1988 arcade game and a 2005 video game
 "Narc", a song by Interpol from Antics

Organizations
 National Advertising Review Council, an American advertising industry body
 National Agricultural Research Centre in Pakistan
 National Rainbow Coalition, a political party in Kenya
 National Rainbow Coalition – Kenya (NARC–Kenya), a political party in Kenya
 North American Rayon Corporation
 National Association for Retarded Children, the former name of Arc of the United States, a disability organization

Science
 Neutrino Array Radio Calibration in Antarctica